The Uganda national netball team represent Uganda in international netball. In line with other women's representative sports teams in Uganda, the netball team are known as the "She-Cranes". Uganda are currently ranked seventh in the INF World Rankings.

History

World Cups
Uganda qualified through to the 2015 World Cup after qualifying via the African system where they defeated Zimbabwe, Zambia, Swaziland and Botswana along the way to finish on top of Africa and making it through to their first World Cup since the 5th edition which was held in Trinidad and Tobago.

Uganda were drawn in Group D which had consisted of Fiji, Zambia and Wales. The opening game of the tournament for the team was up against Zambia in which Uganda got off to a flying start when they won 74-38 to record their biggest margin for the team in a World Cup with the captain of the squad Peace Proscovia scoring fifty-six goals in the victory. The next opponent was up against Fiji and Uganda led all of the quarters in the game with Peace Proscovia being the top goalscorer with thirty-seven goals to give Uganda a 61-40 victory. The final match of the group stage saw them take on fellow unbeaten team in Wales and for Uganda, they had their first loss of the campaign with Wales coming back from four goals down at three quarter time to get a two-point victory with Peace Proscovia being top goalscorer for Uganda with twenty six.

With Uganda getting through to the top eight on the back of two wins, they got drawn to play against fellow African team Malawi, New Zealand and Jamaica in Pool E. Despite the team fast finish in the final quarter of their first game against Malawi, they would end up losing the match 59-53 in what would be their closest match of the qualification round. The next two matches would see Uganda being outplayed as they lost to Jamaica by twelve goals  before being smashed by New Zealand for a 43-goal margin after they elected to not go with their regular starting lineup.

Uganda would finish in eighth place after they would lose their final two matches after losing to South Africa before a rematch with Wales saw the team lose by nineteen goals with Peace Proscovia being the top goalscorer of the match with thirty-one goals.

Uganda qualified for the 2019 Netball World Cup.

Commonwealth Games

The Ugandan netball team made their first appearance at the 2018 Commonwealth Games in Australia, where the team finished third and only narrowly missed out on qualifying for the medals matches, having been beaten by narrow margins against New Zealand and England in the pool stage. They finished the tournament in sixth place, losing the fifth-place playoff match to South Africa by 11 goals.

Other events
Uganda won the Nations Cup 2013 tournament, held in Singapore's Toa Payoh Sports Hall.

Tournament results

More recently the team played a three-match series in England, where they lost to the Roses though were thoroughly competitive in all three matches.

Competitive record

See also
 Sport in Uganda
 Netball in Africa

References

National netball teams of Africa
Netball